The Restigouche-class destroyer was a class of seven destroyer escorts that served the Royal Canadian Navy and later the Canadian Forces from the late-1950s to the late-1990s. All seven vessels in the class were named after rivers in Canada.

Delays in design and construction saw the number of vessels for the St. Laurent class halved to seven. The seven remaining vessels were redesigned as the Restigouche class, taking into account design improvements found during construction of the St. Laurents. The seven ships of the class were commissioned between 1958 and 1959.

Design and description

Based on the preceding  design, the Restigouches had the same hull and propulsion, but different weaponry. Initially the St. Laurent class had been planned to be 14 ships. However the order was halved, and the following seven were redesigned to incorporate improvements made on the St. Laurents. As time passed, their design diverged further from that of the St. Laurents.

The Restigouches had a complement of 214.

The Restigouches were powered by two English Electric geared steam turbines, each driving a propeller shaft, using steam provided by two Babcock & Wilcox boilers.

The Restigouches were equipped with SPS-10, SPS-12, Sperry Mk 2 and SPG-48 radar along with SQS-501 and SQS-503 sonar.

Armament
The Restigouches diverged from the St. Laurents in their weaponry. The Restigouches were equipped with one twin mount of Vickers /70 calibre Mk 6 dual-purpose guns forward and maintained one twin mount of 3-inch/50 calibre Mk 22 guns aft used in the preceding class. A Mk 69 fire control director was added to control the new guns. They were also armed with two Limbo Mk 10 mortars and two single Bofors 40 mm guns. However the 40 mm guns were dropped in the final design.

Each twin mount had a 360° train rate, was capable of elevation between −15° and 90°, and able to elevate at 30° per second.

The 3 in/50 Mk 22 dual-purpose gun was a United States design that dated back to the Second World War. The twin mount was manually operated and had a train rate of 360° and capable of elevation between −15° and 85°. The 3 in/50 mounting was placed in the 'Y' position.

Placed on stabilized mountings, the projectiles always entered the water at the same angle.

The destroyers were also equipped beginning in 1958 with Mk 43 homing torpedoes in an effort to increase the distance between the ships and their targets. They were pitched over the side by a modified depth charge thrower.

Improved Restigouche Escorts (IRE)
As part of the 1964 naval program, the Royal Canadian Navy planned to improve the attack capabilities of the Restigouche class. Unable to convert the vessels to helicopter-carrying versions like the St. Laurents due to budget constraints, instead the Restigouches were to receive variable depth sonar (VDS) to improve their sonar range, placed on the stern, and the RUR-5 anti-submarine rocket (ASROC). The destroyers also received a stepped lattice mast. Called the Improved Restigouche Escorts (IRE), Terra Nova was the first to undergo conversion, beginning in May 1965. The conversion took ten months to complete, followed by sea trials. The sea trials delayed the conversion of the next ship for four years. By 1969, the budget for naval programs had been cut and only four out of the seven (Terra Nova, Restigouche, Gatineau and Kootenay) would get upgraded to IRE standards and the remaining three (Chaudière, Columbia, and St. Croix) were placed in reserve.

The ASROC launcher replaced the 3 in/50 cal twin mount and one Mk 10 Limbo mortars aft. The torpedo was acoustically guided. The ships carried eight reloads.

Destroyer Life Extension (DELEX)
The Destroyer Life Extension (DELEX) refit for the four surviving Restigouches was announced in 1978. An effort by Maritime Command to update their existing stock of naval escorts, the DELEX program affected 16 ships in total and came in several different formats depending on the class of ship it was being applied to. On average, the DELEX refit cost $24 million per ship. For the Restigouches this meant updating their sensor, weapon and communications systems. The class received the new ADLIPS tactical data system, new radar and fire control systems and satellite navigation. The ships had the Mk 127E navigational radar, SPS-502 radar and AN/SPG-515 fire control radar and Mk 69 gunnery control system installed. The upper part of the lattice mast was removed and replaced by a pole mast with a TACAN antenna fitted to it. The AN/SQS-505 C3 sonar dome was fared into the hull and the  Bofors illumination rocket system was removed, replaced by a Super RBOC chaff system.

The class were also fitted with two triple  Mk 32 torpedo tube mountings to use the new Mk 46 torpedo. They were situated between the ASROC launcher and the Limbo mortar well. The ships began undergoing their DELEX refits in the early 1980s. However, by the time the ships emerged from their refits, they were already obsolete as the Falklands War had changed the way surface battles were fought.

Gulf War refit

With the advent of the Gulf War in August 1990, Maritime Command was asked to have a fleet of ships available to send to the Persian Gulf, preferably three ships. The   and the replenishment ship  would be made part of the task force, however all the other Iroquois-class vessels were in refit. Maritime Command chose from among the remaining fleet the vessel with the best electronic countermeasures suite, Terra Nova, to deploy with the task force. Terra Nova was quickly altered to make her ready for an active war zone. The ship's ASROC system was landed and instead two quad Harpoon surface-to-surface missile system was installed. A Mk 15 Phalanx close-in weapon system was placed on the quarterdeck in place of the landed Limbo ASW mortar and two 40 mm/60 calibre Boffin guns were installed in single mounts where the ship's boats were. The ship was also fitted with new chaff, electronic and communications systems. Restigouche received a similar refit before deploying as Terra Novas intended replacement in the Persian Gulf in 1991.

Service history
Seven ships were ordered as part of the 1951-2 budget, as repeat St. Laurents. Constructed at several shipyards across the country, the first to enter service was the lead ship of the class, Restigouche on 7 June 1958, followed by St. Croix later in 1958 and Gatineau, Kootenay, Columbia, Terra Nova and Chaudière in 1959. While still in builder's hand, Restigouche suffered a collision with the freighter Manchester Port in November 1957. Following her commissioning she was present at the opening of the Saint Lawrence Seaway in 1959, alongside Terra Nova.

In 1960, Terra Nova and St. Croix escorted the royal yacht , carrying Queen Elizabeth II on a royal visit. In 1968, Gatineau became the first Canadian warship to become a member of STANAVFORLANT, the standing NATO naval force in the Atlantic. On 23 October 1969, while in European waters, Kootenay suffered a gearbox explosion that killed 7 and injured 53 of the crew. This was Canada's worst peacetime naval accident.

Terra Nova was the first to undergo IRE conversion, beginning in May 1965. In September 1969, Gatineau began her IRE conversion. While Kootenay was being repaired following the explosion, she began her IRE conversion. Restigouche began her IRE conversion in 1970. Of the three ships that did not undergo the conversion, Chaudière was reduced a training ship in 1970. St. Croix and Columbia were paid off on 15 February and 18 February 1974 respectively and placed in reserve. St. Croix had her propellers and guns removed and was turned into a fleet school from 1984 until 1990. Columbia was fixed so that her engines could run at dockside while being unable to move. Chaudière was paid off on 23 May 1974 and used for spare parts for the remaining ships. All three were discarded in the early 1990s, with Chaudière and Columbia become artificial reefs while St. Croix was broken up.

Gatineau was the first to undergo her DELEX refit, beginning in September 1981. Of the vessels in the class, Kootenay and Terra Nova were found to have the same problem. They were repaired within six months. Terra Nova underwent her DELEX refit beginning in November 1983, followed by Restigouche beginning in December 1984, Kootenay in 1984. In June 1989, Kootenay collided with the merchant vessel Nord Pol which severely damaged her bow. Her bow was removed and replaced with the bow of Chaudière.

In 1990, Kootenay was among the Canadian task group that visited the Soviet Union for the first time since World War II. That same year Terra Nova was modified for service in the Gulf War. Her intended replacement in the Persian Gulf, Restigouche, also received the modifications, however was instead redirected to STANAVFORLANT. However, in 1992, the ship was deployed to the Red Sea as part of a multinational force. In 1993, Gatineau was among the Canadian vessels assigned to enforce United Nations sanctions on Haiti. In 1994, Kootenay was sent to enforce the sanctions on Haiti. In 1995, Gatineau took part in the NATO naval exercise Strong Resolve and in April that year, supported the Canadian Coast Guard in the Turbot War.

Restigouche was paid off on 31 August 1994. She was sunk off Acapulco, Mexico in June 2001. Kootenay was paid off on 18 December 1996 and was also sold for use as an artificial reef off Mexico. Gatineau and Terra Nova were paid off on 1 July 1998 and were sold for scrapping in October 2009.

Ships in class

References

Notes

Citations

Sources

External links

 Photo of HMCS Kootenay (pre IRE)
 Restigouche-class DDE (escort destroyer) – Hazegray.org

Destroyer classes